WBAE may refer to:

 WBAE (AM), a radio station (1490 AM) licensed to Portland, Maine, United States
 Alpena CW, an Alpena, Michigan cable-only channel and CW television affiliate which identifies fictionally as WBAE for program guide and ratings purposes